Tragiscoschema bertolonii is a species of beetle in the family Cerambycidae. It was described by James Thomson in 1857. It is known from Tanzania, South Africa, the Democratic Republic of the Congo, Angola, Mozambique, and Zimbabwe.

The body of T. bertolonii is long and slim. The length is close to 1.3 cm and the antenna is longer than the body. There is a black stripe across the head and body. Yellow marks cover the head and body at the sides.

Varietas
 Tragiscoschema bertolonii var. tenuicorne Thomson, 1865
 Tragiscoschema bertolonii var. amicta Distant, 1869
 Tragiscoschema bertolonii var. wewitschi Paiva, 1862
 Tragiscoschema bertolonii var. wahlbergi Fahraeus, 1872

References

Tragocephalini
Beetles described in 1857